S. erythraeae may refer to:

 Sansevieria erythraeae Mattei, a succulent plant species in the genus Sansevieria
 Sonchus erythraeae Schweinf. ex Penz., a dandelion species in the genus Sonchus

Synonyms
 Setaria erythraeae Mattei, a synonym for Setaria pumila, a grass species

See also
 S. erythraea (disambiguation)